The Rocky Mountain Athletic Conference Men's Basketball Tournament is the annual conference basketball championship tournament for the Rocky Mountain Athletic Conference. The tournament has been held every year since 1993, when the RMAC became an NCAA Division II conference. It is a single-elimination tournament and seeding is based on regular season records.

The winner, declared conference champion, receives the conference's automatic bid to the NCAA Men's Division II Basketball Championship.

Tournament format
Since its foundation in 1993, the tournament has featured only the top 8 teams from the conference playing in a single-elimination style tournament. The first rounds are always played at the gym of the higher-seeded team while the semifinal and championship rounds are played at a pre-determined site, usually on the campus of one of the RMAC members.

Results

Championship appearances by school

 Chadron State, South Dakota Mines, and Westminster have yet to advance to the RMAC tournament final.
 Utah Tech (Dixie State) and Western New Mexico never qualified for the RMAC tournament final before departing the conference.
 ‡Former member of the RMAC.

See also
 RMAC women's basketball tournament

References

NCAA Division II men's basketball conference tournaments
Shootout
Recurring sporting events established in 1993